Reform School is an American film produced by Million Dollar Productions in 1939, starring Louise Beavers. The film was directed by Leo C. Popkin. In 1944 the film was re-released as Prison Bait.

Beavers plays as Mother Barton, a probation officer of a large city that believes in a plan for an "honor system" at a reform school. When the previous superintendent of the school is ousted, she becomes superintendent and has to address a brutal guard, the previous superintendent's "henchmen", and teens at the school. Reginald Fenderson played a supporting role as "Freddie Gordon", one of the boys at the school.

The film debuted a group called the "Harlem Tuff Kids", which included Eugene Jackson playing as "Pete", DeForrest Covan as "Bill", Eddie Lynn as "Joe" and Bob Simmons as "Johnny". The Harlem Tuff Kids also appeared in the 1942 film Take My Life.

The executive producer of the film was Harry M. Popkin. The writers were Jos. O'Donnell and Hazel Jamieson.

Posters for the film remain.

In 2022 a print restored by the Academy Film Archive premiered on Turner Classic Movies. Source: TCM website, AMPAS website.

Cast
 Louise Beavers as Mother Barton
 Reginald Fenderson as Freddie Gordon
 Monte Hawley as head guard Jackson
 Maceo Sheffield as Superintendent Stone
 Robert Webb
 Paul White (actor)
 Harlem Tuff Kids

References

External links 
 
 
 
 

1939 films
American black-and-white films
Race films
1930s English-language films
Films directed by Leo C. Popkin